The 2012–13 Miami RedHawks men's basketball team  represented Miami University during the 2012–13 NCAA Division I men's basketball season. The RedHawks, led by first year head coach John Cooper, played their home games at Millett Hall and were members of the East Division of the Mid-American Conference. They finished the season 9–22, 3–13 in MAC play to finish in last place in the East Division. They lost in the second round of the MAC tournament to Eastern Michigan.

This season was the first -and only- season to air on the Cincinnati radio station WCFN (now WOSL). It aired on "FM 100.3 The Fan" from its December 30 game vs. Wilmington, when the station launched its sports format, until the end of the season in March. WCFN returned to its rhythmic oldies, which it previously carried as WMOJ "Mojo 100.3" format 3 months later as WOSL "Old School 100.3", ending the broadcast of RedHawks basketball on 100.3.

Roster

Schedule

|-
!colspan=9| Exhibition

|-
!colspan=9| Regular season

|-
!colspan=9| 2013 MAC tournament

References

Miami
Miami RedHawks men's basketball seasons